Baljit ("Baljeet") Singh Saini (born 12 August 1976 in Ropar, Punjab) is a field hockey defender and midfielder from India who made his international debut for the Men's National Team in 1995 during the Indira Gandhi Gold Cup.  Baljit Singh Saini represented his native country at two consecutive Summer Olympics, starting in 1996 in Atlanta, Georgia, where India finished in eighth place. His older brother Balwinder Singh was also a field hockey international for India.

Baljit has won many awards. In June 2008 he visited the US again, while participating in tournaments. He participated in many tournaments throughout the US, visiting many different states and cities during his triumphut run. Baljit also has family who resides in Fresno, California (USA) and he was honored by the Indian Community of Fresno, CA. In an event organized by Rama Kant Dawar and Paramjit Singh Mond, hosted by Kam Nigam, Baljit received an Honorary Recognition Award for his successes.

References
 Bharatiya Hockey

External links
 

1976 births
Living people
Field hockey players at the 1996 Summer Olympics
Field hockey players at the 2000 Summer Olympics
Olympic field hockey players of India
Indian male field hockey players
People from Rupnagar
Recipients of the Arjuna Award
Place of birth missing (living people)
Indian Sikhs
Field hockey players from Punjab, India
Asian Games medalists in field hockey
Field hockey players at the 1998 Asian Games
Asian Games gold medalists for India
Medalists at the 1998 Asian Games
1998 Men's Hockey World Cup players
2002 Men's Hockey World Cup players